Usemikent is a rural locality (a selo) in Kayakentsky District, Republic of Dagestan, Russia. The population was 1,996 as of 2010. There are 44 streets.

Geography 
Usemikent is located 14 km west of Novokayakent (the district's administrative centre) by road. Kayakent and Shalasi are the nearest rural localities.

Nationalities 
Kumyks live there.

References 

Rural localities in Kayakentsky District